Bohdan Eduardovych Strontsitsky (born 13 January 1968) is a retired Soviet and Ukrainian professional footballer.

References

External links
 
 Strontsitsky at allplayers.in.ua

1968 births
Living people
Sportspeople from Lviv
Soviet footballers
Ukrainian footballers
Ukrainian Premier League players
FC Krystal Kherson players
FC Skala Stryi (1911) players
FC Karpaty Lviv players
FC Karpaty-2 Lviv players
FC Karpaty-3 Lviv players
SC Tavriya Simferopol players
FC Spartak Ivano-Frankivsk players
FC Kalush players
Ukrainian football managers
FC Nyva Ternopil managers
Association football goalkeepers